The 2011 GP2 Asia Series was the fourth and final season of the GP2 Asia Series, and the second to be held entirely in a single calendar year.

Season summary 
Rather than starting at the end of 2010 and running through the winter as with the previous two seasons of GP2 Asia, the 2011 season did not start until the beginning of February, to allow for the delivery of the brand new GP2/11 car to the teams and allow for testing before using it in the Asia Series. Previously the Asia Series had used the first generation GP2 car. The season also saw the début of three teams in the Series: two new teams, Carlin and Team Air Asia, as well as Racing Engineering, who had not competed in the Asia Series since its establishment.

The season was originally scheduled for six races to be held at three meetings, beginning on 11 February at the Yas Marina Circuit in the United Arab Emirates, and finishing on 13 March at the Bahrain International Circuit. However, both meetings due to be held in Bahrain, scheduled for 17–19 February and 11–13 March, were cancelled due to anti-government protests in the country's capital, Manama. On 1 March 2011, series organisers added a replacement final round of the Asia Series, to be held at the Autodromo Enzo e Dino Ferrari in Imola, Italy on 19–20 March.

Inaugural Asia Series champion Romain Grosjean of the DAMS team won the championship for the second time after title rival Jules Bianchi of Lotus ART was taken out of the final race by Super Nova Racing's Fairuz Fauzy. Giedo van der Garde finished third for the Barwa Addax Team, taking podiums in both races at Imola. As well as feature race victories apiece for Grosjean and Bianchi, sprint race victories were taken by Stefano Coletti of Trident Racing and Dani Clos of Racing Engineering. As well as Grosjean's drivers' championship win, DAMS also claimed the teams' championship by three points from Lotus ART.

Entry list
All of the teams used the Dallara GP2/11 chassis with Mecachrome 4.0 litre (244 cu in) V8 engines order and with tyres supplied by Pirelli.

Calendar
The calendar was announced on 7 October 2010, with three rounds to be held in February and March, down from four in 2009–2010. Organisers explained the reduction of the calendar as being necessary because of the need to deliver the brand-new Dallara GP2/11 chassis to all teams. Yas Marina hosted the season-opening event, before two scheduled meetings in Bahrain. The Bahrain events were subsequently cancelled due to civil unrest in the country, and was later replaced by a special event to be held at Imola. The race in Abu Dhabi was the first time the GP2/11 chassis was used. A yellow background indicates a non-Asian event.

Championship standings
Scoring system
Points are awarded to the top 8 classified finishers in the Feature race, and to the top 6 classified finishers in the Sprint race. The pole-sitter in the feature race will also receive two points, and one point is given to the driver who set the fastest lap inside the top ten in both the feature and sprint races. No extra points are awarded to the pole-sitter in the sprint race.

Feature race points

Sprint race points
Points are awarded to the top 6 classified finishers.

Drivers' Championship

Notes:
† — Drivers did not finish the race, but were classified as they completed over 90% of the race distance.

Teams' Championship

Notes:
† — Drivers did not finish the race, but were classified as they completed over 90% of the race distance.

Notes

References

External links
GP2 Series official website

GP2 Asia Series seasons
GP2 Asia
GP2 Asia Series